The Loudwater Mystery is crime novel by the British writer Edgar Jepson which was first published in 1920. Police are called in to investigate the suspicious death of Lord Loudwater and eventually deduce he was murdered by his private secretary. Or maybe not.

Adaptation

In 1921, the novel was made by Broadwest into a silent film directed by Walter West and starring Gregory Scott, Pauline Peters and Clive Brook.

References

Bibliography
 Goble, Alan. The Complete Index to Literary Sources in Film. Walter de Gruyter, 1999.

External links
 
 The Loudwater Mystery at Gutenburg.org

1920 British novels
British novels adapted into films
Novels by Edgar Jepson
British crime novels
British mystery novels
Novels set in England
Odhams Press books